Venezuela Solidarity Campaign is a British political organisation which expresses support to the Bolivarian Revolution and campaigns against its threats. Its Scottish section is known as the Scottish Venezuela Solidarity Campaign (SVSC).

Aims
According to the campaign, its aims are:
To defend Venezuela's sovereignty and independence.
To support the right of the Venezuelan people to determine their own future free from external intervention.
To provide accurate and up-to-date information in support of democracy and social progress in Venezuela.
To defend the achievements of the Bolivarian Revolution.
To support and build activity around these objectives throughout Britain, within parliament, regional and local government, the trade unions, amongst women, lesbian and gay communities, black, Asian and Latin American communities, students and all others.

Activities
The VSC was established in 2005 in response to an attempted military coup against the then President of Venezuela, Hugo Chávez. It sought to promote and strengthen links between trade unionists in Britain and Venezuela, organised solidarity tours to Venezuela, and promoted awareness of the Bolivarian Revolution through a DVD, The Revolution will not be Televised. From 2009 the group promoted another documentary DVD, Inside the Revolution: A Journey into the Heart of Venezuela, directed by Pablo Navarrete.

Following the death of Chávez in 2013, the campaign continued its work in support of his successor as president, Nicolás Maduro. The activities of the VSC and SVSC in 2015-16 included maintaining websites with extensive information about the situation in Venezuela; organising conferences, lectures and other events; publishing a magazine, Viva Venezuela!; maintaining a social media presence, and seeking to influence parliamentarians and others.

Key people

Honorary president
Ken Livingstone, former Labour MP and Mayor of London (2000-2008)

Patrons
Diane Abbott, Labour MP for Hackney North and Stoke Newington
Kelvin Hopkins, former Labour MP for Luton North
Bruce Kent, political activist and former Priest
Ann Pettifor, academic

Former patrons (due to decease)

Rodney Bickerstaffe was a patron until his death in 2017.

Affiliates
Trade union bodies affiliated to the VSC include the Southern and Eastern TUC (SERTUC), Yorkshire and Humberside TUC and Camden Trades Council. Individual unions affiliated include Unite the Union, the University and College Union, the National Union of Teachers, the Public and Commercial Services Union, ASLEF, BECTU, BFAWU, CWU, FBU, GMB, MU, Napo, NUM, PCS, RMT, TSSA, UCATT, UCU, Unite the Union and UNISON.

Trade union affiliates to the SVSC include the STUC, CWU, EIS, GMB, RMT, UNISON, Unite the Union, and Trades Councils in Dundee, Kilmarnock & Loudon and Midlothian.

References

External links
website of the VSC
website of the SVSC

Political organisations based in London
United Kingdom–Venezuela relations
Political advocacy groups in the United Kingdom
Organizations established in 2005
2005 establishments in the United Kingdom
Politics of Venezuela